Wheat germ agglutinin (WGA) is a lectin that protects wheat (Triticum) from insects, yeast and bacteria. An agglutinin protein, it binds to N-acetyl-D-glucosamine and Sialic acid. Succinylated WGA is selective for β-N-acetylglucosamine (β-GlcNAc), making it a useful tool for detecting O-GlcNAc. N-acetyl-D-glucosamine in the natural environment of wheat is found in the chitin of insects, and the cell membrane of yeast & bacteria. WGA is found abundantly—but not exclusively—in the wheat kernel, where it got the 'germ' name from. In mammals the N-acetyl-D-glucosamine that WGA binds to is found in cartilage and cornea among other places. In those animals sialic acid is found in mucous membranes, e.g. the lining of the inner nose, and digestive tract.

In solution, WGA exists mostly as a heterodimer of 38,000 daltons. It is cationic at physiological pH. It contains a Carbohydrate-binding module called CBM18.

Use in molecular biology 
WGA is also widely used in biological research. Since WGA binds to glycoconjugates in can be used to label cell membranes and fibrotic scar tissue for imaging and analysis.

See also 

 Proteopedia: 2uvo – High resolution crystal structure of Wheat Germ Agglutinin in complex with N-acetyl-D-glucosamine
 Proteopedia: 2uwg – Crystal structure of Wheat Germ Agglutinin isolectin 1 in complex with glycosylurethan

References 

Lectins